albert is an environmental organisation aiming to encourage the TV and film production industry to reduce waste and its carbon footprint. Additionally, albert offers guidance on how to promote and discuss environmental issues in editorial content through an initiative called ‘Planet Placement’. albert began as a project at the BBC, in 2011  but was adopted by BAFTA early on.

Initially, albert offered the industry a bespoke carbon calculator to measure the impact of its productions. The calculator allows a production to calculate its predicted carbon footprint from pre- to post-production. Productions can then go through the certification process, where they implement sustainable production techniques to reduce carbon emissions where possible, and offsets where it is not. Productions that successfully complete certification are awarded a 1, 2 or 3 star certificate and given use of the albert Sustainable Production logo on their credits.

Currently, all BBC, ITV, Channel 4, UKTV, Sky and Netflix productions in the UK are required to register their carbon footprint using the albert carbon calculator.

Initiatives 
Besides its carbon calculator, Albert is involved in promoting sustainability in other areas of the screen industry.

Green Rider 
In May 2019, Albert launched the 'Green Rider' project in association with Spotlight. The Green Rider takes its name from the Inclusion Rider, as a way to champion climate action through an actor’s contract, calling for good environmental practices to be observed on set. For example, requesting plant-based catering, low energy lighting, or for the production company to agree to a ‘zero to landfill’ policy for its sets.

Creative Energy 
Albert started the Creative Energy project in 2017, which enables production companies to switch to a 100% renewable energy supplier. The supplier that Albert partners with is reviewed every year based on ‘green’ criteria. The current supplier is Good Energy. Additionally, creative offsets is another upcoming Albert scheme which allows productions to offset/mitigate their environmental impact with carbon offsetting schemes.

Screen New Deal 
In September 2020, albert launched the 'Screen New Deal' report in association with the British Film Institute and Arup as a route-map to help film production transition to net zero emissions by 2050. The report explores and gives examples of how more sustainable practices can be implemented across the film and TV industries.

Directorate 
Albert's strategy and development is supported by a commissioning directorate. The directorate currently consists of the BBC, ITV, C4, Sky, Netflix and BT Sport.

Productions with Albert certification

Productions that meet the criteria for sustainability are awarded one, two or three stars.

Three stars

Two stars

One star

References

External links

2011 establishments in the United Kingdom
British Academy of Film and Television Arts
Environmental certification marks
Sustainable business
Television in the United Kingdom